Feldschlösschen is a Swiss beverage and brewing company located in Rheinfelden, in the German-speaking canton of Aargau, Switzerland.

Founded in 1876, the company operates the biggest brewery in Switzerland by production, the Feldschlösschen Brewery. It bought out Cardinal in 1991, and became a division of Carlsberg in 2000. In addition to beer, it also produces non-alcoholic beverages and mineral waters. The following brands are produced:

 Feldschlösschen
 Feldschlösschen Alcohol Free
 Hürlimann (merged in 1996)
 Cardinal (acquired in 1991)
 Carlsberg
 Tuborg
 Sommersby
 Pepsi
 Gurten
 Valaisanne
 Warteck
 Castello (beer)
 Schweppes
 7up
 Lipton Ice Tea

Similarly named German brewer 
Feldschlößchen (with the eszett, ß) is the name of a brewer in Dresden, Germany, with no relation. See:

See also 

 Beer in Switzerland
 Calanda Bräu, the main competitor brewery, owned by Heineken

Notes

References

External links

 Official site

Beer in Switzerland
Rheinfelden (Aargau)